The Science, Technology, Engineering and Mathematics Network or STEMNET is an educational charity in the United Kingdom that seeks to encourage participation at school and college in science and engineering-related subjects (science, technology, engineering, and mathematics) and (eventually) work.

History
It is based at Woolgate Exchange near Moorgate tube station in London and was established in 1996. The chief executive is Kirsten Bodley. The STEMNET offices are housed within the Engineering Council.

Function
Its chief aim is to interest children in science, technology, engineering and mathematics. Primary school children can start to have an interest in these subjects, leading secondary school pupils to choose science A levels, which will lead to a science career. It supports the After School Science and Engineering Clubs at schools. There are also nine regional Science Learning Centres.

STEM ambassadors
To promote STEM subjects and encourage young people to take up jobs in these areas, STEMNET have around 30,000 ambassadors across the UK. these come from a wide selection of the STEM industries and include TV personalities like Rob Bell.

Funding
STEMNET used to receive funding from the Department for Education and Skills. Since June 2007, it receives funding from the Department for Children, Schools and Families and Department for Innovation, Universities and Skills, since STEMNET sits on the chronological dividing point (age 16) of both of the new departments.

See also
 The WISE Campaign
 Engineering and Physical Sciences Research Council
 National Centre for Excellence in Teaching Mathematics
 Association for Science Education
 Glossary of areas of mathematics
 Glossary of astronomy
 Glossary of biology
 Glossary of chemistry
 Glossary of engineering
 Glossary of physics

References

External links
 
 DIUS page
 STEM Partnerships (extensive background educational information)

Department for Business, Innovation and Skills
Department for Education
Educational charities based in the United Kingdom
Educational institutions established in 1996
Engineering education in the United Kingdom
Engineering organizations
Mathematics education in the United Kingdom
Mathematics organizations
Organisations based in the London Borough of Camden
Science and technology in the United Kingdom
1996 establishments in the United Kingdom